NK Mladost is a football club based in the town of Proložac and currently competes in the 1. ŽNL. For some time club carried the name NK Imotska krajina.

External links
NK Mladost Proložac at Nogometni magazin 

Football clubs in Croatia
Football clubs in Split-Dalmatia County
Association football clubs established in 1948
1948 establishments in Croatia